Rapkin is a surname. Notable people with the surname include:

 David Rapkin, American recording engineer, sound designer, and audio producer
 Franceska Rapkin (1936–2001), British philatelist
 Leon Vincent Rapkin (1929–1991), British philatelist